The 2013 Ontario Scotties Tournament of Hearts, women's provincial curling championship, was held January 21–27, 2013 at the Kitchener-Waterloo Granite Club in Waterloo, Ontario. The winning Rachel Homan rink went on to represent Ontario at the 2013 Scotties Tournament of Hearts in Kingston, Ontario.

Qualification Process
Ten teams qualify for the provincial tournament through several methods. Four teams qualify from Northern Ontario, two teams qualify from Regions 1&2, two teams qualify from regions 3&4 and two teams qualify from the Challenge Round.

Teams

Standings

Results

Draw 1
January 21, 7:00 PM

Draw 2
January 22, 2:00 PM

Draw 3
January 22, 7:00 PM

Draw 4
January 23, 2:00 PM

Draw 5
January 23, 7:00 PM

Draw 6
January 24, 2:00 PM

Draw 7
January 24, 7:00 PM

Draw 8
January 25, 2:00 PM

Draw 9
January 25, 7:00 PM

Tie breaker
January 26, 9:00 AM

Playoffs

1 vs. 2
January 26, 2:00 PM

3 vs. 4
January 26, 7:00 PM

Semifinal
January 27, 9:30 AM

Final
January 27, 4:00 PM

Qualification
Southern Ontario zones run from November 30-December 2, December 7–11 and December 14–18, 2012. Two teams from each zone qualify to 2 regional tournaments, and two teams from each of the two tournaments qualify to provincials. Two additional teams qualify out of a second chance qualifier.

The Northern Ontario provincial championship will occur December 13–16, 2012 at the Little Falls Curling Club in Atikokan, Ontario. Four teams qualify out of the Northern Ontario championship.

Regional Qualifiers In Bold

Southern Ontario Zone Qualification

Zone 1
December 7–9, at the RCMP Curling Club, Ottawa

Teams entered:
Jennifer Harvey (Cornwall)
Katie Morrissey (Ottawa)
Rachel Homan (Ottawa)

Zone 2
December 7–9, at the RCMP Curling Club, Ottawa

Teams entered:

Laura Payne (Rideau)
Lauren Mann (Rideau)
Rhonda Varnes (Rideau)
Tracy Samaan (Rideau)
Barb Kelly (Rideau)

Zone 3
December 7–9, at the Carleton Heights Curling Club, Ottawa

Teams entered:

Jaimee Gardner (City View) (automatically qualifies as only team)

Zone 4
December 7–9, at the Garrison Golf & Curling Club, Kingston

Teams entered:

Lindsay McKeown (Cataraqui)
Lisa Farnell (Loonie)

Both teams qualify as there were no other entries.

Zone 5
December 7–9, at the Fenelon Falls Curling Club, Fenelon Falls

Teams entered:

Angie Melaney (Lakefield)
Julie O'Neill (Lindsay)
Kristine Mitchell (Lindsay)

Zone 6
December 8–11, at the Oshawa Curling Club, Oshawa

Teams entered:

Kaitlin Stubbs (Annandale)
Stephanie Van Huyse (Whitby)
Susan McKnight (Uxbridge)

Zone 7
December 7–9, at the Bayview Golf & Country Club, Thornhill

Teams entered:

Julie Hastings (Bayview)
Jill Mouzar (Donalda)
Elana Sone (East York)
Shawnessy Johnson (East York)
Christine Anderson (Leaside)
Fiona Shearer (Richmond Hill)
Colleen Madonia (Thornhill) (qualified to represent Zone 3, due to lack of entries there)

Zone 8
December 8–9, at the St. George's Golf & Country Club, Toronto

Cathy Auld (Mississaugua)
Ashley Waye (Royals)
Kelly Cochrane (High Park)

Zone 9
December 7–9, at the Markdale Golf & Curling Club, Markdale

Teams entered:

Heather Graham (King)
Marika Bakewell (Markdale)
Jen Spencer (Brampton)

Zone 10
December 7–9, at the Bradford & District Curling Club, Bradford

Teams entered:

Julie Reddick (Bradford) 
Sherry Middaugh (Coldwater)
Kristeen Wilson (Midland)
Julie Truscott (Parry Sound)

Zone 11
December 7–9, at the Chesley Curling Club, Chesley

Teams entered:

No teams entered.

Zone 12
November 30-December 2, at the Elora Curling Club, Elora

Teams entered:
Kristy Russell (Elora) (qualifies out of zone 11 due to lack of teams)
Sheri Smeltzer (Fergus)
Courtney Hodgson (Guelph)
Kathy Ryan (Kitchener-Waterloo Granite)
Taylor Mellor (Kitchener-Waterloo Granite)
Tiffany Anjema (Westmount) (qualifies out of zone 11 due to lack of teams)

Zone 13
December 14–18, at the Hamilton Victoria Club, Hamilton

Teams entered:

Michelle Fletcher (Burlington)
Ginger Coyle (Dundas Granite)
Candace Coe (Dundas Granite)
Katie Lindsay (Welland)

Zone 14
December 7–9, at the Listowel Curling Club, Listowel

Teams entered:

Allison Nimik (Listowel)
Kelsey Bennewies (Seaforth)

Both teams advance as they were the only two teams to enter

Zone 15
December 7–9, at the Aylmer Curling Club, Aylmer

Teams entered:

Jacqueline Harrison (Brant)
Chantal Lalonde (Woodstock)
Dianne Dykstra (Brant)

Zone 16
December 7–9, at the Forest Curling & Social Club, Forest

Teams entered: 
Brenda Anderson (Forest)
Bethany Heinrichs (Ilderton)

(Both teams qualified as the only entries)

Regions 1 & 2
January 4–6 , Omemee Curling Club, Omemee

Regions 3&4
January 4–6 , Woodstock Curling Club, Woodstock

Challenge Round
January 11–13, at the Oakville Curling Club in Oakville

Northern Ontario Provincials
The Northern Ontario provincial championship was held from December 13 to 16, 2012 at the Atikokan Curling Club in Atikokan, Ontario.

Teams

Round-robin standings

Round-robin results
All draw times listed in Eastern Standard Time.

Draw 1
Friday, December 14, 1:30 pm

Draw 2
Friday, December 14, 7:30 pm

Draw 3
Saturday, December 15, 10:00 am

Draw 4
Saturday, December 15, 6:30 pm

Draw 5
Sunday, December 16, 9:00 am

Tie breaker
Sunday, December 16, 1:00 pm

Kendra Lilly advances to the provincials.

References

External links

Ontario
Scotties Tournament of Hearts
Ontario Scotties Tournament of Hearts
Sport in Waterloo, Ontario
Ontario Scotties Tournament of Hearts